Heards is an unincorporated community in Albemarle County, Virginia.  State Route 633 passes through the hamlet of Heards and connects to Ottoway in the west.

References

Unincorporated communities in Virginia
Unincorporated communities in Albemarle County, Virginia